The Weepah Hills are a mountain range in Esmeralda County, Nevada.  The highest point in the mountains is over 2,000 m. They are named for the Shoshone word meaning 'rainwater'.

References 

Mountain ranges of Nevada
Mountain ranges of the Great Basin
Mountain ranges of Esmeralda County, Nevada